Neversink may refer to:

Places in the U.S. state of New York
Neversink, New York, a town in Sullivan County
Neversink Gorge, in Forestburgh
Neversink Preserve, in Orange County
Neversink Reservoir, a New York City Reservoir in the Town of Neversink
Neversink River, a tributary of the Delaware River

Other
USS Neversink, a pseudonym for the USS United States (1797) applied by author Herman Melville
A short story in the collection When the Nines Roll Over by David Benioff

See also

Navesink (disambiguation)